Pladis Global (styled as pladis) is a British confectionery and snack foods company encompassing United Biscuits, Ülker, Godiva Chocolatier and DeMet’s Candy Company. It was formed in January 2016 as a subsidiary of Yıldız Holding with its headquarters in London, England. The company has 34 factories in 13 countries and its products reach approximately 4 billion people worldwide in 120 countries across Europe, the Middle East, Africa, Asia and the Americas.

The pladis name was inspired by the Pleiades constellation, a group of seven stars visible from anywhere on Earth.

Brands 
Godiva Chocolates was acquired by Yildiz Holding in 2008. In 2014, Yildiz acquired DeMet's Candy Company for $221 million, which includes the US wholesale brand Flipz and Turtles. That same year, Yildiz acquired United Biscuits, the parent company of McVitie's, making it the third largest cookie company in the world. Pladis also owns Go Ahead, Koninklijke Verkade which includes brands such as Verkade and Sultana, and Biskrem.

 Ülker Biscuits: Turkish food and beverage brand with a presence in 80 countries. Ülker manufacturers of food products including biscuits and confectionery
 United Biscuits includes McVitie's, a leading snack food brand in the UK and Europe as well as a top 5 UK Food Brand. In February 2016, United Biscuits released McVitie's Digestive Nibbles, reducing traditional biscuits to bite-sized format. In January 2017, McVities launched a line of thinner chocolate digestives, meant to be a healthier alternative than traditional biscuits. In May 2017, pladis announced it would be launching McVitie's biscuits in the US in 2018. Jaffa Cakes is a part of McVitie's, and was reformatted in 2017. McVities also produce Hobnobs, Rich Tea, Penguins, Jacob's cream crackers, Carr's water biscuits, Crawford's, Meredith and Drew and go ahead!.
DeMet’s Candy Company, which includes Flipz and Turtles
 Godiva: manufacturer of premium chocolates and related products, founded in Belgium in 1926 pladis sells Godiva in grocery channels. At the May 2017 Sweet & Snacks Expo in Chicago, pladis launched Godiva Masterpieces, which included the top three best selling case pieces from Godiva boutiques in individually wrapped candies. The line was initially sold through Costco. At the same time, pladis announced it was releasing a uniform formulation for Godiva chocolate which was based on the original Belgian recipe developed in 1926. In September 2017, pladis launched the Godiva Masterpieces line in the UK, and announced a partnership in which Masterpieces would be carried in Sainsbury stores. pladis partnered with supermarkets in the UK, North America, China, Turkey, Sweden and Saudi Arabia and other countries to sell the Masterpieces line.

References

External links
 

Confectionery companies
Food and drink companies established in 2016
Food manufacturers based in London
Yıldız Holding